Xenopathia novaki is a moth in the family Blastobasidae. It is found in Croatia, Greece and on Corsica.

References

Moths described in 1891
Blastobasidae